Uma G. Gupta is a Professor of Business at the State University of New York at Buffalo State in Buffalo, New York, a motivational speaker and a business consultant.

Uma Gupta was awarded the Top Ten Influential Women in Technology in Houston, Texas, and was nominated again for this distinguished award in 2012 in Rochester, New York. She was awarded a Fulbright Award in 2012 to the University of Malta in Malta. She also founded STEM-SMART, an NGO to promote STEM careers on the United States.

Uma has written about sixty articles on research journals with her article “Theory and applications of the Delphi technique: A bibliography (1975–1994)” reaching over 390 citations. She has written two textbooks on information technology: Information Systems: Success in the 21st Century and Management and Information Systems: A Managerial Perspective.

Education & career
Uma Gupta holds a PhD in industrial engineering and an MBA from the University of Central Florida. She was born in Chennai, India. Expert Systems in 1981 from the University of Central Florida, from 1981 to 1985 she was an associate professor and on the later year Uma received from the same University her MBA.
After she received the MBA she became the Endowed Chair of IT at the Creighton University for three years, later moving to the State University of New York as a Professor of Management until 2008. In 2009 she founded STEM-SMART, a NGO that tries to engage students in STEM careers on the United States.
In 2012 she won a Fulbright Award.
She is now professor of Technology & Business at the State University of New York at Buffalo State.

Dr. Uma Gupta has published over 30 papers on various journals, two major textbooks and has participated in many workshops/conferences and as a keynote speaker as can be seen on her website.
Her two most cited works are Theory and applications of the Delphi technique: A bibliography (1975–1994) an investigation on the Delphi Technique or Delphi Method, a forecasting method that was developed on the first years of the Cold War. This work surveys the literature from 1975 to 1994 for the methodology and applications on the Delphi method. The second work is Outsourcing the IS function: Is it necessary for your organization? is a research on outsourcing the IS function on companies, providing help to companies trying to decide if outsourcing is a viable option or not.

References

External links
 Uma Gupta webpage

Year of birth missing (living people)
Living people
State University of New York faculty
University of Central Florida alumni
University of Central Florida faculty